Iiro Sopanen is a Finnish professional ice hockey forward who currently plays for Pelicans of the SM-liiga. He is the younger brother of Vili Sopanen, another Finnish hockey player.

References

External links

1989 births
Living people
Lahti Pelicans players
Sportspeople from Lahti
Finnish ice hockey forwards